Jerai Torres (born 25 May 1994) is a male Gibraltarian sprinter. He represented his country in the 200 metres at the 2013 and 2015 World Championships in Athletics without advancing from the first round.

International competitions

Personal bests
100 metres – 10.91 (+1.1 m/s, Malaga 2018)
200 metres – 21.71 (+0.7 m/s, Elche 2018)
400 metres – 49.32 (Barcelona 2018)

References

External links
 All-Athletics profile

Gibraltarian male sprinters
Living people
1994 births
Gibraltarians
World Athletics Championships athletes for Gibraltar
Athletes (track and field) at the 2015 European Games
Athletes (track and field) at the 2014 Commonwealth Games
Athletes (track and field) at the 2018 Commonwealth Games
Commonwealth Games competitors for Gibraltar